Julián Duarte  (born ) is a Mexican male volleyball player. He was part of the Mexico men's national volleyball team at the 2014 FIVB Volleyball Men's World Championship in Poland. He played for Sonora.

Clubs
   Sonora (2014)

References

1994 births
Living people
Mexican men's volleyball players
Place of birth missing (living people)